Cathcart Street Goods was a goods terminus in Birkenhead, England. Originally known as Bridge End, the station was situated adjacent to the East Float, on the Birkenhead Dock Branch railway line. The station was opened in 1856, and closed in 1961.

References

Sources
 

Disused railway goods stations in Great Britain